Carl Wenzel Zajicek  (29 February 1860 – 19 March 1923) was a Viennese painter.

He was born as one of 24 children of watchmaker Franz Zajicek.
Educated in his father's craft, he worked as a watchmaker until 1900, but he practiced artistic painting as an amateur from a young age. 
Inspired by Emil Hütter, he specialized on Vedute of the city of Vienna, and he rose to notability in 1896 with a large panoramic painting.

Literature 
 Carl Wenzel Zajicek: „Spaziergang durch das historische Wien“. Galerie Szaal, Wien.

19th-century Austrian painters
Austrian male painters
Austrian people of Czech descent
20th-century Austrian painters
1860 births
1923 deaths
Artists from Vienna
19th-century Austrian male artists
20th-century Austrian male artists